Harold Grant Pigott  (20 August 1894 – 26 August 1979) was an Antiguan-born Anglican bishop who served as Bishop of the Windward Islands from 1962 until 1969.

He was educated at the Codrington College, Barbados and ordained in 1918. After a curacy at St Lucy, Barbados, he was Rector of Barrouallie and Calliaqua on St Vincent. After this he was Archdeacon of St Vincent and then Grenada before his appointment to the episcopate.

References

1894 births
Alumni of Codrington College
20th-century Anglican bishops in the Caribbean
Anglican bishops of the Windward Islands
Commanders of the Order of the British Empire
1979 deaths
Archdeacons of Grenada
Archdeacons of St Vincent
Deans of St George's Cathedral, Kingstown